Colonel Maritza Sáenz Ryan (born c. 1960) is a former United States Army officer, and head of the Department of Law at the United States Military Academy. She was the first woman and first Hispanic (Puerto Rican and Spanish heritage) West Point graduate to serve as an academic department head.

As the most senior ranking Hispanic Judge Advocate, Sáenz Ryan has raised awareness of the inequity and impracticality of the Combat Exclusion Policy, which restricts women's roles and opportunities in the military regardless of talent or ability.

Early years
Sáenz Ryan (birth name: Maritza Olmeda Sáenz ) was born in New York City to a Puerto Rican father and Spanish mother. There she received her primary and secondary education. In the late 1970s she was accepted in the United States Military Academy, also known as "West Point." Sáenz Ryan was a member of only the third class to include women cadets at West Point.

She graduated from West Point in 1982 and was commissioned as a Second Lieutenant in the Field Artillery.

Military career
Sáenz Ryan was assigned to the 1st Armored Division Artillery in Nuremberg, West Germany. She returned to the United States and, through the U.S. Army's Funded Legal Education Program, she attended law school in Nashville, Tenn., at Vanderbilt University. After earning her law degree, Sáenz Ryan was selected for Order of the Coif and in 1988, admitted to the New York State Bar #2235323. Sáenz Ryan was reassigned to the Judge Advocate General's Corps (JAGC) as a trial counsel at Fort Sill, Oklahoma.

Sáenz Ryan, who had been promoted to the rank of captain, was deployed overseas during Operations Desert Shield and Desert Storm and was assigned as the brigade legal counsel for a Field Artillery brigade.

She returned to JAG Corps headquarters in Washington, DC. and earned her master's degree in Law (LLM) from the Judge Advocate General's School in Charlottesville, Virginia. She was later selected to attend the Command & General Staff College at Fort Leavenworth, Kansas. In 1999, while she was attending the Command and General Staff College, doctors found and removed a cancerous tumor from her leg. Sáenz Ryan recovered, continued on Army active duty, and applied for a professorship at West Point Academy.

In August, 2001, Sáenz Ryan was appointed Deputy Head, Department of Law, at the U.S. Military Academy, one of two newly created permanent military faculty positions in the department. Her Commanding officer and mentor, Brigadier General Pat Finnegan, allowed her to receive treatment for her condition and to have a full recovery before she could assume her position full-time.

In 2006, after accepting the presidential nomination and being confirmed by Congress, Sáenz Ryan was named head of the Department of Law at the United States Military Academy. She replaced former head Finnegan, who left to become the academy's Dean of the Academic Board.

Sáenz Ryan is currently the most senior-ranking Hispanic Judge Advocate. She is also the first woman and first Hispanic West Point graduate, to serve as an academic department head.

Sáenz Ryan played an instrumental role in raising awareness of the inequity and impracticality of the Combat Exclusion Policy, which restricts women's roles and opportunities in the military regardless of talent or ability.  In 2008, the West Point Center for the Rule of Law was established under her leadership.

Personal life
While studying and training at West Point, Sáenz Ryan met fellow cadet Robert Ryan. They later married and had two children. Their son Alexander is a cadet 2nd class at the U.S. Coast Guard Academy, and their son Andrew is a Cadet candidate at the U.S. Military Academy Preparatory School.

Honors
In 2000, Sáenz Ryan was named as one of the "Top 100 Influential Hispanics" by Hispanic Magazine. On August 7, 2010 she received the Margaret Brent Award, given annually by the ABA's (American Bar Association) Commission on Women in the Profession, to women lawyers who have achieved professional excellence in their field and share a commitment to champion other women.

Military awards decorations
Amongst Col. Sáenz Ryan 's military awards and decorations are the following:

  Meritorious Service Medal
  Joint Services Commendation Medal
  Army Commendation Medal
  National Defense Service Medal
  Armed Forces Expeditionary Medal
  Southwest Asia Service Medal
  Army Service Ribbon
  Kuwait Liberation Medal (Saudi Arabian)
  Kuwait Liberation Medal (Kuwait)
  Army Overseas Service Ribbon

Badges
  Air Assault Badge
  Parachutist badge

See also

List of Puerto Ricans
List of Puerto Rican military personnel
Puerto Rican women in the military
Irish immigration to Puerto Rico
History of women in Puerto Rico

Notes

References

Further reading 

1960 births
Living people
American people of Spanish descent
American people of Puerto Rican descent
Female United States Army officers
Puerto Rican Army personnel
Puerto Rican military officers
Puerto Rican women in the military
Recipients of the Meritorious Service Medal (United States)
United States Army officers
United States Military Academy alumni
Women in the United States Army